Stephanothelys is a genus of flowering plants from the orchid family, Orchidaceae, endemic to South America.

Species accepted as of June 2014:

Stephanothelys colombiana Garay - Colombia
Stephanothelys rariflora Garay - Bolivia
Stephanothelys siberiana Ormerod - Bolivia
Stephanothelys sororia Garay - Peru
Stephanothelys xystophylloides (Garay) Garay - Colombia, Ecuador

See also 
 List of Orchidaceae genera

References

External links 

Orchids of South America
Cranichideae genera
Goodyerinae